Hoag's Object is an unusual ring galaxy in the constellation of Serpens Caput. It is named after Arthur Hoag, who discovered it in 1950 and identified it as either a planetary nebula or a peculiar galaxy. The galaxy has approximately eight billion stars, and is roughly 120,000 light years across.

Characteristics
A nearly perfect ring of young hot blue stars circles the older yellow nucleus of this ring galaxy c. 600 million light-years away in the constellation Serpens. The ring structure is so perfect and circular that it has been referred to as "The most perfect ring galaxy". The galaxy is estimated to have a mass of 700 billion suns. By comparison, the Milky Way galaxy has an estimated diameter of 150-200 kly and consists of between 100 and 500 billion stars and a mass between 800 billion and 1.54 trillion suns.

The gap separating the two stellar populations may contain some star clusters that are almost too faint to see. Though ring galaxies are rare, another more distant ring galaxy (SDSS J151713.93+213516.8) can be seen through Hoag's Object, between the nucleus and the outer ring of the galaxy, at roughly the one o'clock position in the image shown here.

Noah Brosch and colleagues showed that the luminous ring lies at the inner edge of a much larger neutral hydrogen ring.

History and formation

Even though Hoag's Object was clearly shown on the Palomar Star Survey, it was not included in either the Morphological Catalogue of Galaxies, the Catalogue of Galaxies and Clusters of Galaxies, or the catalogue of galactic planetary nebulae.

In the initial announcement of his discovery, Hoag proposed the hypothesis that the visible ring was a product of gravitational lensing.  This idea was later discarded because the nucleus and the ring have the same redshift, and because more advanced telescopes revealed the ring's knotty structure, which would not be visible if the galaxy were a product of gravitational lensing.

Many of the galaxy's details remain mysterious, foremost of which is how it formed. So-called "classic" ring galaxies are generally formed by the collision of a small galaxy with a larger disk-shaped galaxy, producing a density wave in the disk that leads to a characteristic ring-like appearance. Such an event would have happened at least 2–3 billion years ago, and may have resembled the processes that form polar-ring galaxies. However, there is no sign of any second galaxy that would have acted as the "bullet", and the likely older core of Hoag's Object has a very low velocity relative to the ring, making the typical formation hypothesis quite unlikely. Observations with one of the most sensitive telescopes have also failed to uncover any faint galaxy fragments that should be observable in a collision scenario. However, a team of scientists that analyzes the galaxy admits that "if the carnage happened more than 3 billion years ago, there might not be any detritus left to see."

Noah Brosch suggested that Hoag's Object might be a product of an extreme "bar instability" that occurred a few billion years ago in a barred spiral galaxy. Schweizer et al claim this is an unlikely hypothesis because the nucleus of the object is spheroidal, whereas the nucleus of a barred spiral galaxy is disc-shaped, among other reasons. However, they admit evidence is somewhat thin for this particular dispute to be settled satisfactorily.  

A few other galaxies share the primary characteristics of Hoag's Object, including a bright detached ring of stars, but their centers are elongated or barred, and they may exhibit some spiral structure. While none matches Hoag's Object in symmetry, these galaxies are known to some as Hoag-type galaxies.

See also
LEDA 1000714

Notes

1974 O'Connell paper assumes a Hubble constant of 75; this figure adjusts for 2013's .

References

External links

Hubble Space Telescope image of Hoag's Object. 
Accretion Rings Galactic Rings – Fund. Cosmic Physics, 1996. Vol. 17, pp. 95–281
A Wheel within a Wheel (09/05/2002) News Release Number: STScI-2002-21 – HubbleSite
ESA/Hubble image of Hoag's Object

Ring galaxies
Serpens (constellation)
Peculiar galaxies
54559
?